The Holden Ute was a coupe utility built by Holden, the Australian subsidiary of General Motors, since 2000. Before then, Holden had marketed their Commodore-based utility models under the Holden Utility (VG) and Holden Commodore utility (VP, VR, VS) names, although the term “Holden Ute” was also used in their official marketing literature. The Holden Ute name is often used for earlier Holden Utility models (which were produced from 1951 to 1984) as the word "ute" is a colloquial term used commonly in Australia for a utility vehicle or pickup truck. Holden's performance division, an independent company called HSV assembles a high-performance version called the Maloo. Between 2003 and 2007, Holden built a stretched, crew cab version of the Ute with four doors and seating for five, called the Holden Crewman and between 2003 and 2005 a cab-chassis version known as the Holden One Tonner.

The Ute launched with a locally built 3.8-litre Ecotec V6 engine of Buick design. A 5.7-litre Generation III V8 engine option was also available, but this was replaced by the 6.0-litre Generation 4 in 2006, and updated to the L98 specification later on that year. In 2004, Holden replaced the venerable V6 with a 3.6-litre Alloytec unit.

The Australian-assembled Ute was to be sold in the United States as the Pontiac G8 ST starting in 2009 alongside the four-door Commodore-based G8 sedan. However, due to GM's company-wide model review, a result of the 2008 global financial crisis, such plans were shelved on 6 January 2009. Exports of the G8 sedan remain unaffected. Sales  of the Ute in South Africa as the Chevrolet Lumina SS commenced during 2006/2007 and in Middle East in 2009/2010, making it the first full-size Chevrolet coupé utility ever since the 1987 discontinuation of the El Camino (even though this Lumina was never sold in the USA).

'Holden' Coupe Utility

First Generation

The Holden 50-2106 was the first Holden Ute, based on the Holden 48-215.

Second Generation 

The second generation 'ute' was a revision of the 50-2106 and was based on the FE to EK Holden and retained the sedan body as a base.

Third Generation 

The third generation Holden-based ute was slightly more refined than previous models, however still retained the full length floorpan, although gained the station wagon's wheelbase.

Fourth generation

Fifth generation 

The HQ-HZ was the first full body redesign of the ute and dropped the rear station wagon floor pan for a shorter, front row only style floorpan, along with introducing the Holden One Tonner cab-chassis, the HQ ute is highly desirable as it is the only 'Muscle era' Holden ute tagged to allow a 350 cubic-inch Chevrolet Small Block V8, removing the need to get an engineer to sign off on modifications. Although, as a result, these utes are highly restricted in states such as Victoria, for P-Plate drivers, although not surpassing legal power to weight limitations by a fair margin.

First generation (2000–2007)

VU 

Holden introduced the Ute range with the VU, replacing the Holden VS Utility. The VU's arrival was a full 36 months after the VT Commodore sedan, meaning it arrived in time for the launch of Holden's VX Commodore series. The Ute employs the same interior as the Commodore, while also picking up the VX's upgraded equipment lists and re-styled exterior design.
Base : Built up from the Commodore Executive's specification. Available with 3.8-litre  Ecotec V6 - 4sp auto, 5sp manual or 5.7-litre  Generation 3 V8 - 6sp manual or 4sp auto
S : Based on Commodore 'S' specification. Available with 3.8-litre  Ecotec V6 - 4sp auto, 5sp manual speed.
SS : Based on Commodore SS specification, minus side-impact airbags. Available with a 5.7-litre  Generation 3 V8 - 6sp manual or 4sp auto
The range received a minor refresh with the VX Series 2 models 12 months later, with the major upgrade being an additional  to Holden's Generation 3 V8's.

In October 2001 The VU Ute came out in a special edition "SS Fifty" (pictured right) to mark the 50th anniversary.
This model has only 500 units produced. Every SS 50 was identical in terms of color schemes, all 500 units were released with a black exterior and a partial leather interior that contained plenty of "hyper yellow" accents.
Other items that made the SS 50 different were the chrome sports bar on the back, unique black-and-yellow engine cover, a leather-wrapped steering wheel, handbrake cover and gear knob as well as a color-coded instrument cluster to match the leather bolsters on the sports seats.

The VU's were superseded by the VY range in September 2002.

VY 

The Ute range received its first major facelift in the form of the 2002 VY range. VY Ute's received the same upgrades as the sedan/wagon range, which involved a new, sharper-designed nose, and more European-styled interior. The same three specification models were carried over for the VY, and picked up the same upgraded equipment lists as the VY sedans.
The VY range marked major change for Holden's Ute range, with the 2003 addition of two new models: the return of the One Tonner cab-chassis utility after an 18-year hiatus; and the introduction of Holden's first-ever 4-door utility, arriving in the form of the Crewman. Powered by a  V8 engine, the Cross 8 featured a modified appearance, more suited to an off-road vehicle.

Both the Crewman and One Tonner models added instant sales to the Holden range, sparking rapid expansion of the Holden Ute range, its first major growth spurt since its 1990 re-introduction. Once again the same three specifications were carried over for the VY, with the Ute range available in base Ute, S & SS forms. The same did not apply for the One-Tonner cab-chassis range though – it was available in just two model forms, base and S.
Base: Based on Commodore Executive specification. Available with 3.8-litre  Ecotec V6
S : Based on Commodore S specification. Available with 3.8-litre  Ecotec V6 – 4sp auto, 5sp manual
SS: Based on Commodore SS specification. 5.7-litre  Generation 3 V8 – 6sp manual or 4sp auto

By December 2003 the Crewman range had expanded to include Holden's very first AWD utility in the form of the Crewman Cross 8. The Cross 8 received bolstered wheelarches, raised ride height as well as additional equipment, with the sole drivetrain being the recently upgraded Gen.3 V8 connected to a 4-speed automatic. V6-powered versions of the One Tonner & Crewman were only available with automatic transmission. The VY's were superseded by the arrival of the VZ range in August 2004

VZ 

The final series of Holden's VT-generation was the VZ range, launched in August 2004. Holden's main upgrade for the VZ's was the introduction of an all-new Alloytec V6, replacing Holden's previous Ecotec V6's which had been in use since the 1995 launch of the VS Commodore. Whilst the sedan VZ range received both versions of the Alloytec V6, the ute range received just the lower-capacity Alloytec 175 - it was the standard engine across the entire ute range with a six-speed manual - an upgraded 4-speed automatic was available as an option. Once again the One Tonner & Crewman ranges shared the same specification models, as shown below:
Base: Based on Commodore Executive specification. Available with 3.6-litre  Alloytec V6 - 6sp manual or 4sp auto
S: Based on Commodore SV6 specification. Available with 3.6-litre  Alloytec V6 - 6sp manual or 4sp auto
SS: Based on Commodore SS specification (minus side-impact airbags on cab-chassis). Available with a 5.7-litre  Generation 3 V8, or the new  6.0-litre Generation 4 V8 'L98' - 6sp manual or 4sp auto
Crewman's were once again available in Cross 8 form, whilst the VZ range added the Crewman Cross 6, essentially a V6 version of the Cross 8.

One-Tonners were available with the following specifications:
Base :Based on Commodore Executive specification. Available with 3.6-litre  Alloytec V6 - 6sp manual or 4sp auto or 5.7-litre  Generation 3 V8 - 6sp manual or 4sp auto
S: Based on Commodore SV6 specification minus fog-lights. Available with 3.6-litre  Alloytec V6 - 6sp manual or 4sp auto or 5.7-litre  Generation 3 V8 - 6sp manual or 4sp auto
Cross 6: AWD One-Tonner. Available with 3.6-litre  Alloytec V6 - 4sp automatic only
SVZ: Based on the SV6 plus leather seats, paddle shifts on the steering wheel, Monaro CV8 rims. Available with 3.6-litre  Alloytec V6 - 5-speed automatic or 6-speed manual

To make room in the factory for the upcoming VE Commodore, production of the One Tonner ceased in December 2005.

The Ute range continued without any updates for the next 18 months, until the January 2006 addition of Holden's new L76 V8's. Holden's new V8 range was introduced after its previous Generation 3 V8 failed to meet new Euro III emission standards introduced in Australia on January 1, 2006. The new Generation 4 V8's contained an additional  compared to their predecessors (the ute's had previously received an addition  of power, inline with the VZ Sedan range), but were missing two key features compared to their American counterparts: both Displacement on Demand and variable valve timing had been removed. The Alloytec 175 also lost  of power due tweaks made to meet Euro III standards.'
The VZ Utes remained on sale well after the introduction of Holden's next-generation VE sedans, as did the VZ Wagons. By December of the same year, the Crewman and all AWD variants of the ute were gone from showrooms after Holden ceased production, whilst the curtain was brought down on the One-Tonner range once again after poor sales results. Holden's VZ Utes were superseded by the 8th-generation VE Ute range in September 2007.

Second generation (2007–2017)

VE 

2007 saw the launch of Holden's eagerly anticipated VE Ute range, unveiled to the media in August, with showroom sales began later in the month. The new generation designated VE, based on the VE Commodore tackles an upward consumer tendency towards using utes as lifestyle vehicles. This further shifts the ute away from the traditional workhorse market.
Omega: The base model, having similar standard features to the Omega sedan but can carry more than the SS-V, SS and SV6.
SV6: A sportier version of the V6 ute, the SV6 replaced the S-pack from previous models.
SS-V Redline (Series II):A performance version of the SS-V offering Brembo brakes, 19-inch Alloy wheels, FE3 Super Sports Performance Suspension and a mandatory tyre inflater kit.

Unlike the previous VU–VZ generation, no double-cab, cab-chassis or AWD variants are offered.

VF 

The VF Ute was basically a modernization of the previous model, being almost the same visually to the casual observer. Production ended in 2017 when Holden stopped producing vehicles in Australia and the brand was focused only on imported models by other GM brands, this also lead to the discontinuation of its Commodore base and the Statesman/Caprice ranges. Holden's pickup then became solely the mid-size Isuzu-sourced Colorado until 2020 when the Holden brand was completely retired. 

Isuzu currently markets its D-Max model range (which is related to the Colorado) under its own brand in Australasia.

Holden Special Vehicles 

Starting in 1992, Holden's performance outfit, Holden Special Vehicles (HSV), built a performance version of the ute named the Maloo.

References

External links 

Holden - New Cars - Large: Ute
An Aussie Icon Turns 50 - The Holden Ute: 1951 - 2001
History of the Holden Ute

Cars of Australia
Full-size vehicles
Ute
Coupé utilities
Rear-wheel-drive vehicles
Cars introduced in 2000
2010s cars